Elcho is an unincorporated community and census-designated place (CDP) in the town of Elcho, Langlade County, Wisconsin, United States. Elcho has a post office with ZIP code 54428. As of the 2010 census, its population was 339.

Images

See also
 List of census-designated places in Wisconsin

References

External links

Census-designated places in Langlade County, Wisconsin
Census-designated places in Wisconsin